The Scorpaeniformes  are a diverse order of ray-finned fish, including the lionfishes and sculpins, but have also been called the Scleroparei. It is one of the five largest orders of bony fishes by number of species, with over 1,320.

They are known as "mail-cheeked" fishes due to their distinguishing characteristic, the suborbital stay: a backwards extension of the third circumorbital bone (part of the lateral head/cheek skeleton, below the eye socket) across the cheek to the preoperculum, to which it is connected in most species.

Scorpaeniform fishes are carnivorous, mostly feeding on crustaceans and on smaller fish. Most species live on the sea bottom in relatively shallow waters, although species are known from deep water, from the midwater, and even from fresh water. They typically have spiny heads, and rounded pectoral and caudal fins.

One of the suborders of the Scorpaeniformes is the Scorpaenoidei. This suborder is usually found in the benthic zone, which is the lowest region of any water body like oceans or lakes. 

There are two groups of the Scorpaenoidei. The sea robins is the first, which are further classified into two families: the sea robins and the armored sea robins. One significant difference between the two families of sea robins is the presence of spine-bearing plate on the armored sea robins which is absent in the sea robins family.

The second group of the Scorpaenoidei suborder is the scorpionfishes, which according to Minouri Ishida's work in 1994 and recent studies, have twelve families. The scorpionfishes are very dynamic in size with the smallest one having a range of 2–3 cm, while the largest have a length of approximately 100 cm.

Classification
The division of Scorpaeniformes into families is not settled; accounts range from 26 to 35 families. The 5th edition of Fishes of the World classifies the order as follows:

Order Scorpaeniformes
Suborder Scorpaenoidei
 Family Scorpaenidae Risso, 1827 (Scorpionfishes)
 Family Aploactinidae Jordan & Starks, 1904 (Velvetfishes)
 Family Eschmeyeridae  Mandrytsa, 2001 (the cofish)
 Family Pataecidae Gill, 1872 (Australian prowfishes)
 Family Gnathanacanthidae Gill, 1892 (Red velvetfish)
 Family Congiopodidae Gill, 1889 (Racehorses, pigfishes or horsefishes)
Suborder Platycephaloidei
 Family Triglidae Rafinesque, 1815 (Searobins)
 Family Peristediidae Jordan & Gilbert, 1883 (Armored searobins)
 Family Bembridae Kaup, 1873 (Deepwater flatheads)
 Family Platycephalidae Swainson, 1839 (Flatheads)
 Family Hoplichthyidae Kaup, 1873 (Ghost flatheads)
 Suborder Normanichthyiodei
 Family Normanichthyidae Clark, 1837 (the Barehead scorpionfish or mote sculpin)
 Suborder Zoarcoidei
 Family Bathymasteridae Jordan & Gilbert, 1883 (Ronquils)
 Family Eulophiidae H. M. Smith, 1902 (Spinous eelpouts)   
 Family Zoarcidae Swainson, 1839 (Eelpouts)
 Family Stichaeidae Gill, 1864 (Pricklebacks)
 Family Cryptacanthodidae Gill, 1861 (Wrymouths)
 Family Pholidae Gill, 1893 (Gunnels)
 Family Anarhichadidae Bonaparte, 1835 (Wolffishes)
 Family Ptilichthyidae Jordan & Gilbert, 1883 (Quillfish)
 Family Zaproridae Jordan, 1896 (Prowfishes)
 Family Scytalinidae Jordan & Starks, 1895 (Graveldivers)
 Suborder Gasterosteoidei
 Family Hypoptychidae Steindachner, 1880 (the Korean Sandlance)
 Family Aulorhynchidae Gill (1861) (Tubesnouts)
 Family Gasterosteidae Bonaparte, 1831 (Sticklebacks)
 Suborder Cottoidei
 Superfamily Anoplopomatoidea (Quast, 1965)
 Family Anoplopomatidae Jordan & Gilbert, 1883 (Sablefishes)
 Superfamily Zaniolepidoidea  Shinohara, 1994
 Family Zaniolepididae Jordan & Gilbert, 1883 (Combfishes)
 Superfamily Hexagrammoidea Gill, 1889
 Family Hexagrammidae Jordan, 1888 (Greenlings)
 Superfamily Trichodontoidea Nazarkin & Voskoboinikova, 2000
 Family Trichodontidae Bleeker, 1859 (Sandfishes)
 Superfamily Cottoidea Gill, 1889
 Family Jordaniidae Jordan & Evermann, 1898 (Longfin sculpins)
 Family Rhamphocottidae Jordan & Gilbert, 1883 (Grunt sculpins)
 Family Scorpaenichthyidae Jordan & Evermann, 1898
 Family Agonidae Swainson, 1839 (Poachers and searavens)
 Family Cottidae Bonaparte, 1831 (Sculpins)
 Family Psychrolutidae Günther, 1861 (Bighead sculpins)
 Family Bathylutichthyidae Balushkin & Voskoboinikova, 1990 (Antarctic sculpins)
 Superfamily Cyclopteroidea Gill, 1873
 Family Cyclopteridae Bonaparte, 1831 (lumpfishes or lumpsuckers)
 Family Liparidae Gill, 1861 (Snailfishes)
This classification is not settled, however, and some authorities classify these groupings largely within the Order Perciformes as the suborders Scorpaenoidei, Platycephaloidei, Triglioidei and Cottoidei, Cottodei including the infraorders Anoplopomatales, Zoarcales, Gasterosteales, Zaniolepidoales, Hexagrammales and Cottales. These infraorders largely correspond with the superfamilies in the Cottoidei set out in the 5th edition of Fishes of the World.

Timeline of genera

See also
 List of fish families

Notes

References

 

 
Ray-finned fish orders
Articles which contain graphical timelines